My Elusive Dreams was Bobby Vinton's twentieth studio album, released in 1970.

The title track, a remake of a 1967 Tammy Wynette/David Houston hit, is the album's only single. Cover versions include B.J. Thomas' hit "Raindrops Keep Fallin' on My Head", the Beatles' hit "Something", "Leaving on a Jet Plane", "I'll Never Fall in Love Again", "I Will Follow You" (a different version of Little Peggy March's hit "I Will Follow Him"), and Barbara Lewis' hit "Baby I'm Yours".

Track listing

Personnel 
Bobby Vinton – vocals
 Billy Sherrill – producer
 Hank Levine – arranger ("Raindrops Keep Fallin' on My Head", "Something", "I'll Never Fall in Love Again", "Leaving on a Jet Plane", "Traces", "Baby Take Me in Your Arms" and "If Ever I Would Leave You")
 Bill Walker – arranger ("My Elusive Dreams", "Baby I'm Yours" and "The Perfect Woman")
 Lou Bradley – engineer
Charlie Brigg – engineer
Tom Sparkman – engineer
Suzanne Szasz – back cover photo

Charts 
Album – Billboard (North America)

Singles – Billboard (North America)

References 

My Elusive Dreams (album)
My Elusive Dreams (album)
Albums produced by Billy Sherrill
Epic Records albums